The Virginia Tillery Round Barn is a round barn located on County Route 738 west of White Hall in Greene County, Illinois. The barn was built in the fall of 1912 for farmer Harry C. Price. Its size suggests that it served as a general-purpose barn, not a dairy barn like the state's larger round barns. Brown tile blocks were used to build the barn, which is topped by a wood shingle roof with a cupola.

Hay was taken in through the door above the barn's north entrance.

The barn was added to the National Register of Historic Places on August 6, 1982. It was one of several barns added as part of the Round Barns in Illinois Multiple Property Submission.

References

Barns on the National Register of Historic Places in Illinois
Buildings and structures in Greene County, Illinois
National Register of Historic Places in Greene County, Illinois
Round barns in Illinois
Barns with hay hoods